Nová Ľubovňa is a village and municipality in Stará Ľubovňa District in the Prešov Region of northern Slovakia.

History
In historical records the village was first mentioned in 1308.

Geography
The municipality lies at an altitude of 562 metres and covers an area of 14.433 km². It has a population of about 2738 people.

Twin towns – sister cities

Nová Ľubovňa is twinned with:
 Zašová, Czech Republic

References

External links
http://www.statistics.sk/mosmis/eng/run.html

Villages and municipalities in Stará Ľubovňa District